Epifanio de los Santos Avenue, commonly referred to by its acronym EDSA, is a limited-access circumferential highway around Manila, the capital city of the Philippines. It passes through 6 of Metro Manila's 17 local government units or cities, namely, from north to south, Caloocan, Quezon City, San Juan, Mandaluyong, Makati, and Pasay.

Named after academic Epifanio de los Santos, the road links the North Luzon Expressway at the Balintawak Interchange in the north to the South Luzon Expressway at the Magallanes Interchange in the south, as well as the major financial districts of Triangle Park, Araneta City, Ortigas Center, Makati CBD, and Bay City.

Structure 
The entire avenue forms part of Circumferential Road 4 (C-4) of Metro Manila's arterial road network, National Route 1 (N1) of the Philippine highway network and Asian Highway 26 (AH26) of the Asian Highway Network, while its westbound service road from Osmeña Highway in barangay Bangkal, Makati forms part of National Route 145 (N145). The locations around the avenue were marked with great economic and industrial growth, proven by the fact that all but two industrial centers in the Metropolis are directly accessible from the thoroughfare. The decent economic growth of the areas around the avenue adds a significant volume of traffic on the avenue, and in recent estimates, and an average of 2.34 million vehicles go through it every day.
The avenue is a divided carriageway, often consisting of 12 lanes, 6 in either direction, with the elevated railroads Manila Metro Rail Transit System Line 3 and Manila Light Rail Transit System Line 1 often serving as its median. Although it is not an expressway, traffic rules and speed limits are strictly implemented to the vehicles that pass along it. It is operated by the Metro Manila Development Authority and is maintained and constantly being repaired by the Department of Public Works and Highways, whose maintenance over EDSA excludes the extension at Bay City in Pasay.

Route description 

EDSA starts from the Bonifacio Monument (Monumento) Circle in Caloocan, its intersection with MacArthur Highway, Rizal Avenue Extension, and Samson Road, the western side of the C-4 Road. The roundabout is also the marker of the 1896 Revolution by Andres Bonifacio. The  of the road are in Caloocan. The Avenue will then enter Quezon City through the Balintawak district, after an intersection with the North Luzon Expressway (NLEX) and A. Bonifacio Avenue at the Balintawak Interchange.

EDSA crosses much of the northern part of Quezon City, passing through the Balintawak, Muñoz, and Project 7 districts. It sharply curves southwards after crossing the North Avenue-West Avenue Intersection in the Triangle Business Park. On the north side of EDSA is the SM City North EDSA. In front of it are the TriNoma mall and the Eton Centris or Centris Walk. ABS-CBN Broadcasting Center and its transmitter can be easily seen from EDSA and continues southwards, slightly turning westwards slowly until it leaves the Triangle Park after crossing the East Avenue-Timog Avenue Intersection, where the GMA Network Center is located. It continues through the district of Cubao, entering the Araneta Center after crossing the Aurora Boulevard Tunnel. In Cubao, several malls, infrastructure and offices are located, most notably the Smart Araneta Coliseum, the biggest coliseum in Southeast Asia. The Avenue curves southwards and crosses Santolan Road near Socorro, where the twin bases of Camps Crame and Aguinaldo are located. The Greenhills Shopping Center and the Eastwood City are also located nearby. EDSA then continues on its route and serves as the boundary of the cities of San Juan and Quezon City. The People Power Monument can be seen on the northbound side of EDSA at its junction with White Plains Avenue. After  in Quezon City, the Avenue will eventually leave the city and enter the City of Mandaluyong. EDSA enters Mandaluyong after crossing the borders of the Ortigas Center. In the Ortigas Center, some notable buildings around the area are the Philippine Overseas Employment Administration building, Robinsons Galleria, SM Megamall, and the bronze EDSA Shrine, a memorial church to the 1986 Revolution. It then curves smoothly westwards after it crosses Boni Avenue and Pioneer Street, and crosses the Pasig River via the Guadalupe Bridge, leaving the city of Mandaluyong.

After crossing the Pasig River, EDSA enters the city of Makati through Guadalupe, where it provides access to the Rockwell Center, a major mixed-use business park in Makati, through J.P. Rizal Avenue. The highway also provides quick access to the city of Taguig and the Bonifacio Global City nearby. After crossing Buendia Avenue, the highway enters the Ayala Center, an important commercial district in the Philippines, where the Greenbelt and Glorietta shopping centers are located via Ayala Avenue.  The road then curves eastwards, continues on a straight route to the city of Pasay, and passing the Chino Roces Avenue, Osmeña Highway and South Luzon Expressway (SLEX) through Magallanes Interchange.

EDSA enters Pasay shortly after crossing SLEX and Osmeña Highway in Makati. In Pasay, the highway provides access to Ninoy Aquino International Airport via a flyover to Tramo Street. EDSA would pass through Pasay Rotonda within Taft Avenue and continues on a straight route until it crosses to Roxas Boulevard. After crossing Roxas Boulevard, it becomes known as EDSA Extension and enters Central Business Park 1-A of the Bay City reclamation area, where SM Mall of Asia is located. EDSA's terminus is at the Globe Rotunda fronting SM Mall of Asia.

Traffic management

The lead agency that manages the flow of traffic along EDSA is the Metropolitan Manila Development Authority (MMDA), a government agency under the Office of the President of the Philippines and is advised by the Metro Manila Mayors League. One of the MMDA's traffic management schemes that is in effect on EDSA, among other major thoroughfares in the metropolis, is the Uniform Vehicular Volume Reduction Program.

Many have observed that the cause of many traffic jams on EDSA is its change from being a highway to an avenue. This resulted the erection of erring establishment, buses and jeepneys. Subsequently, buses have been the target of other traffic management programs, like the MMDA's Organized Bus Route Program. The MMDA is strictly implementing also the Motorcycle and Bus laning in EDSA, making it the second highway in the Philippines ever to have such traffic rule to be enforced, after Commonwealth Avenue.

On January 18, 2016, strict implementation on bus lanes started on the Shaw–Guadalupe segment, where plastic barriers are placed and prohibited entry of private vehicles and taxis on the bus lanes except when turning to EDSA's side streets. Despite the plastic barrier, many private vehicles still enter the lanes.

In June 2020, bus routes in the avenue were rationalized, creating the EDSA Carousel line carried by the new EDSA Busway. The EDSA Busway is separated from normal road traffic and now used only for buses and emergency vehicles. The new bus lane spans from Monumento to PITX and is divided by concreted barriers and steel fences. The old rightmost bus lanes was now opened for all vehicles, with the avenue now having total of 4-5 public-use lanes per direction instead of 3, excluding interchanges.

Decongestion program 
A decongestion program under the Build! Build! Build! Infrastructure Program is ongoing to help decongest EDSA (which is under overcapacity, carrying 402,000 vehicles daily while has the capacity of 288,000). This involves the construction of other roads and bridges that will divert traffic from the avenue. The government aims to reduce travel time from Cubao to Makati to 5–6 minutes.

History

Construction of what was then called the North and South Circumferential Road began in 1939 under President Manuel L. Quezon. The construction team was led by engineers Florencio Moreno and Osmundo Monsod.

The road, starting from North Bay Boulevard in Navotas and ending at Taft Avenue (formerly known as Taft Avenue Extension / Manila South Road) in Pasay, then in the province of Rizal, was finished in 1940 shortly before the outbreak of World War II and the subsequent Japanese Occupation. It was then known as the Manila Circumferential Road or simply as Circumferential Road. It was also renamed to Highway 54 and thus designated as Route 54. The present-day North EDSA section in Caloocan and Quezon City was referred to as Calle Samson (Samson Street), while its section in Pasay was also known as P. Lovina Street. After the independence of the Philippines from the United States in 1946, the road was renamed Avenida 19 de Junio (June 19 Avenue), after the birth date of national hero José Rizal.

In the 1950s, the northern end of the avenue was designated to its present terminus at Bonifacio Monument in Caloocan and its section west of it later became known as Samson Road, General San Miguel Street, and Letre Road, respectively. In the same decade, Rizalists wanted the avenue's name to remain 19 de Junio, while President Ramon Magsaysay wanted the avenue named after Rizal. Residents of Rizal province (to which most parts of Metro Manila belonged until 1975) wanted the avenue to be named after a Rizaleño: the historian, jurist and scholar named Epifanio de los Santos y Cristóbal. The Philippine Historical Committee (now the National Historical Commission of the Philippines), the Philippine Historical Association, the Philippine Library Association, Association of university and College Professors, the Philippine China Cultural Association, and the Philippine National Historical Society, led by fellow Rizaleños Eulogio Rodríguez, Sr. and Juan Sumulong, supported the renaming of Highway 54 to Epifanio de los Santos Avenue.

On April 7, 1959, De los Santos' birth anniversary, Republic Act No. 2140 was passed, renaming the avenue to honor him. Rapid urbanization in the 1960s and 1970s, particularly after the annexation of several Rizal towns to the newly established National Capital Region, marked the growth of the industrial centers along the road, and several other roads connected to the avenue, such as Ayala Avenue and McKinley Road in Makati.

During the rule of President Ferdinand Marcos, traffic jams along the avenue started to build up. Several interchanges were constructed to relieve congestion, including the Balintawak and Magallanes Interchanges. Later, with the implementation of the Metro Manila Arterial Road System in 1965, in order to complete the Circumferential Road 4 system, EDSA was extended from Taft Avenue to Roxas Boulevard, occupying parcels of land along the old F. Rein and Del Pan Streets in Pasay. Until the mid-1980s, many parts of the highway still overlooked vast grassland and open fields.

The EDSA Revolution

By 1986, political opposition to the 20-year dictatorship of President Ferdinand Marcos mounted. In late February, high-ranking military officers including Defence Minister Juan Ponce Enrile and General Fidel Ramos, defected from the Marcos government and seized Camp Crame and Camp Aguinaldo, two military bases located across each other midway along EDSA. This triggered three days of peaceful demonstrations that became the People Power Revolution.

The majority of protesters were gathered at the gates of the two bases, along a stretch of EDSA between the commercial districts of Cubao in Quezon City and Ortigas Center in Mandaluyong. Over two million Filipino civilians, along with political, military, and religious groups led by Archbishop of Manila Cardinal Jaime Sin, succeeded in toppling President Marcos. Corazon Aquino, the widow of assassinated opposition senator Benigno Aquino Jr., was installed as president on the morning of February 25; by midnight, Marcos had escaped Malacañang Palace with his family, and was flying to exile in Hawaii.

Monuments
Several landmarks commemorate historical events that occurred along the avenue. At the intersection of EDSA and Ortigas Avenue is EDSA Shrine, a Catholic church capped by a bronze statue of the Blessed Virgin Mary as Our Lady of Peace. The shrine is dedicated to this Marian title in memory of the pious folk belief that in the 1986 Revolution, the Virgin Mary personally shielded the protesters – many of whom were peacefully praying and singing – as they faced government troops, tanks, and aircraft.

The People Power Monument, consisting of a giant statue and esplanade, sits at the corner of EDSA and White Plains Avenue. Sculpted by Eduardo Castrillo and unveiled in 1993, the central sculpture depicts protesters standing upon a circular podium, all surrounding a woman (representing Ináng Bayan or the Motherland), reaching up to the heavens with her outstretched hands and broken shackles. A Philippine flag rises behind her, while a statue of Ninoy Aquino and an eternal flame stand on either side at its base. A huge, limestone-faced wall with grooves for ribbons in the national colors forms a backdrop to the scene. The surrounding pavement contains a row of flagstaffs, and is the center for protests and ceremonies held on the Revolution's anniversary of February 25.

Recent history

After the People Power Revolution, the highway was commonly referred to as EDSA, and it was connected to its southern extensions.

In 1997, construction began on the Manila Metro Rail Transit System, which runs the length of EDSA from North Avenue to Taft Avenue. It was opened under the administration of Joseph Estrada, the thirteenth President of the Philippines.

The Second EDSA Revolution, which also took place along the avenue, resulted in the peaceful ouster of President Estrada following his impeachment trial. He was succeeded by his Vice-President, Gloria Macapagal Arroyo. She was sworn in on the terrace of EDSA Shrine by then-Chief Justice Hilario Davide Jr. at noon on January 20, 2001, several hours before Estrada and his family fled Malacañang Palace.

The EDSA III, which also took place along the avenue from April 25 to May 1 of the same year, resulted in violence when the supporters of former President Estrada attempted to storm the presidential palace and the military and police were ordered to use their arms to drive them back. Arroyo declared a state of rebellion because of the violence and prominent political personalities affiliated with Estrada were charged and arrested.

In 2006, the avenue was further extended from Roxas Boulevard to the SM Mall of Asia on the Bay City Reclamation Project, where it now ends at the Globe Rotunda, a roundabout. That same year, the avenue was badly damaged in September, when Typhoon Milenyo hit Manila.

In 2010, the LRT Line 1 (LRT-1) of the Manila Light Rail Transit System was extended from Monumento to Roosevelt, ultimately transversing EDSA to end at the site of the current North Avenue MRT Station.

On September 9, 2015, the Philippine National Police (PNP) deployed the Highway Patrol Group to support MMDA traffic constables easing traffic on congested segments of EDSA.

In September 2017, the construction of the North Triangle Common Station was started after numerous delays due to bureaucracy and location disputes. It will connect the LRT Line 1, MRT Line 3, MRT Line 7, and the Metro Manila Subway.

Intersections

Notes

Future developments

Proposed interchanges
An overpass over the North Avenue-West Avenue Intersection and Mindanao Avenue Junction in the Triangle Park and a Flyover over Congressional Avenue and Roosevelt Avenue Intersection in Muñoz are already approved and may start construction in 2013. As of 2020, the project is currently on hold.

Proposed renaming
In 2011, Bohol Representative Rene Lopez Relampagos filed House Bill (HB) No. 5422, proposing to rename Epifanio de los Santos Avenue as "Corazon Aquino Avenue." The proposal is currently pending in the Philippine House of Representatives before the House Committee on Public Works and Highways. According to Relampagos, the idea to rename EDSA after Aquino, who led the 1986 People Power, was conceptualized in the aftermath of her death.

Construction of EDSA-Taft flyover
On April 2, 2013, then-President Benigno Aquino III gave the green light for the construction of a flyover at the perennially traffic-choked corner of EDSA and Taft Avenue in Metro Manila.

The project is estimated to cost , with the flyover extending to about  each side and it will take one and a half years to complete the project.

Barrier-separated bus lanes
After stricter implementation of bus lanes and barrier separation through plastic barriers, the Metropolitan Manila Development Authority (MMDA) will start to replace the orange barriers with a concrete permanent barrier used to separate the bus lanes from private vehicle lanes.

Proposed road pricing scheme
With support from Singapore, the Metropolitan Manila Development Authority proposed the implementation of road pricing, based on the Electronic Road Pricing scheme on Singapore, on EDSA to alleviate traffic congestion, along with providing alternate routes and opening some gated community roads. Implementation is set for 2018, but Rene Santiago, a transport engineer and planner, criticized the proposal because it may only worsen congestion, along with the numerous intersections and side streets along EDSA.

Bus Rapid Transit
The Department of Transportation proposed to have at least two lines of the Metro Manila Bus Rapid Transit System in 2017. EDSA's proposed BRT line will be named "Line 2: Central Corridor". The line will have  of segregated busways covering the length of the road. The agency planned to scrap the project by June 2018. However, this appeal was rejected and the Line 1 which will be built on Quezon Avenue, which passes EDSA, was later approved by the National Economic and Development Authority (NEDA) on November 2. In 2019, Senator Win Gatchalian called for the approval of the BRT system as an alternate to the PNR Metro Commuter Line.

On March 16, 2020, due to the COVID-19 pandemic, the Inter-Agency Task Force for the Management of Emerging Infectious Diseases (IATF-EID) imposed a community quarantine or lockdown, which halted almost all public and private transportations plying in EDSA. This paved way for the immediate construction of the bus rapid transit (BRT) system called EDSA Busway. The interim operations of the BRT system began on July 1, 2020. Intended to be largely served by bus stops along median lanes, some stops are temporarily served by stations on the curbside. The system runs on a dedicated bus lane which is separated by concreted barriers and steel fences.

In popular culture
EDSA is frequently used as a protest site. In August 2012, the Catholic Church assembled a mass rally on EDSA to oppose the Reproductive Health Bill. On September 11, 2013, a prayer vigil called EDSA Tayo was held at the EDSA Shrine, where around 500–700 people were gathered to call for the abolition of the Priority Development Assistance Fund. On February 25, 2015, various groups held a demonstration along EDSA to demand that President Benigno Aquino III stand down. On August 27–31 of the same year, Iglesia ni Cristo adherents staged demonstrations along EDSA near SM Megamall, calling on then-Justice Secretary Leila De Lima to focus on issues such as the Mamasapano clash instead of a case filed by former INC minister Isaias Samson, Jr., against Church leaders. On November 30, 2016, an anti-Marcos protest was held in the People Power Monument due to the burial of Ferdinand Marcos at the Libingan ng mga Bayani. On November 5, 2017, critics of the Duterte administration attended a mass held in EDSA shrine to protest against extrajudicial killings in the country. On February 22, 2018, groups gathered at People Power Monument to hold a prayer vigil to show their opposition against constitutional reform. On February 22, 2020, demonstrators gathered at the People Power Monument to call on President Rodrigo Duterte to resign from office.

The avenue is also used in political campaigns by several politicians, particularly those who had been involved in the EDSA Revolution such as Joseph Estrada and Benigno Aquino III.

EDSA was also featured in the film The Bourne Legacy. Portions of the road from Magallanes Interchange to Taft Avenue were featured in a car chase wherein Aaron Cross, played by Jeremy Renner, jumps from the Taft Avenue footbridge to a plying bus.

Notes

References

External links

People Power Revolution
Streets in Metro Manila
Ring roads
Shopping districts and streets in Metro Manila
Limited-access roads in the Philippines